The M&M's 200 presented by Casey's General Stores was a 200-lap NASCAR Gander RV & Outdoors Truck Series race held at Iowa Speedway in Newton, Iowa. The race ran from 2009 to 2019 before being canceled in 2020 due to the COVID-19 pandemic and removed entirely from the schedule in 2021.

Past winners

2010: The race extended due to a NASCAR Overtime finish.
2019: Race postponed from Saturday night to Sunday afternoon due to rain; Ross Chastain had originally won the race, but his truck failed post-race tech. With NASCAR's new tech policy that if the winning vehicle fails, the vehicle will be disqualified and whoever finished 2nd or is the highest finishing driver whose vehicle passes moves up. Brett Moffitt originally finished 2nd in the race, but due to Chastain's truck failing, and Moffitt passing post-race tech, Moffitt wound up winning the race despite the fact he never led a lap the whole race. This marked the first time since an Xfinity race in 1995 that a driver was disqualified due to post-race tech failure, and stripped of the win.
2020: Race canceled and moved to the Daytona Road Course due to the COVID-19 pandemic.

Multiple winners (drivers)

Multiple winners (teams)

Manufacturer wins

References

External links
 

NASCAR Truck Series races
Former NASCAR races
 
Recurring sporting events established in 2009
Recurring sporting events disestablished in 2020
2009 establishments in Iowa
2020 disestablishments in Iowa
200